Mekoche (or Mequachake, Shawnee: mecoce) was the name of one of the five divisions (or bands) of the Shawnee, a Native American people, during the 18th century. The other four divisions were the Chalahgawtha, Kispoko, Pekowi, and Hathawekela. (All five division names have been spelled in a great variety of ways.) Together these divisions formed the loose confederacy that was the Shawnee tribe.

Traditionally, Shawnee healers came from the Mekoche patrilineal division.

Since the late 20th century, the Lower Eastern Ohio Mekoce Shawnee has organized but it has not gained federal recognition. It is based in Southern Ohio and West Virginia, part of its traditional territory. The tribe, which filed a Letter of Intent to Petition on 3/5/2001 with the Bureau of Indian Affairs, founded The Inter Tribal Learning Circle in 1991. It has held cultural events at Fort Ancient in Lebanon, Ohio.

Pigeon Town, occupied by the Shawnee Mekoche division, was located on Mad River, 3 miles northwest of West Liberty, Logan County, Ohio. Macochee Creek is named for this Shawnee division; it is a small stream that meets the Mad River at West Liberty, having arisen near modern Pickrelltown, Ohio.

Notable Mekoche 
Black Hoof
 Chief Russell "Logan" Sharp (1953-2010), a Lower Eastern Ohio Mekoce Shawnee from Wilmington, Ohio, conducted a Peace Tree Ceremony at West Virginia University in 2009. He lectured on "The Struggle of Non-federally Recognized Natives."

References 

Shawnee